Catarina de Oliveira Lopes Rebelo (born October 14, 1997) is a Portuguese actress.

She has participated in Mar Salgado, a 2014 telenovela nominated for "Best Telenovela" in 2015 at the International Emmy Awards of the International Academy of Television Arts & Sciences that recognizes excellence in television programming produced outside the U.S.

Filmography

TV 

 2007 - Chiquititas, "Anita"
 2008 - Feitiço de Amor, "Maria Sacramento"
 2009 - Ele é Ela, "Olívia Raínha"
 2011 - Remédio Santo, Participação Especial
 2012 - Jogos Cruéis - Telefilme , “Marta”
 2013 - , "Jéssica Costa"
 2014 - Mar Salgado, "Frederica 'Kika' Queiroz"
 2016 - Terapia, "Sofia"
 2017 - Amor Maior, "Marta Resende Borges"
 2019 - Amar Depois de Amar, “Alice Macedo”
 2020 - Terra Nova, “Mariana”
 2020 - Amar Demais, “Joana Campos”
 2022 - Praxx,"Diana"

Cinema 
 2011 - Curta Metragem - Verão Invencível, “Joana” de Hugo Diogo
 2016 - A Mãe é que Sabe, "Daniela" de Nuno Rocha

Teatro 
 2016 - Quase Adaptação de Patrick Marber, encenação: Vera Gromicho
 2019 - Beginners Adaptação de Tim Crouch, encenação: Jorge Costa

References

External links
 

Living people
1997 births
Portuguese actresses